Decticogaster is a genus of moths of the family Crambidae. It contains only one species, Decticogaster zonulalis, which is found on Sulawesi.

The Global Lepidoptera Names Index considers the genus to be a synonym of Tatobotys and the species to be a synonym of Tatobotys varanesalis.

References

Acentropinae
Crambidae genera
Monotypic moth genera